Love of May is a 2004 Taiwanese film directed by Hsu Hsiao-ming and starring Bolin Chen and Liu Yifei. The film was inspired by Mayday, a famous rock band from Taiwan. It tells about the love story of Ah Lei, an administrator of Mayday's fansite, and Zhao Xuan, a fangirl of Mayday, who met and fell in love with each other through a lie.

Plot
Ah Lei (Bolin Chen) is the younger brother of Stone, a guitarist of Mayday. He is also the administrator of Mayday's fansite, in charge of replying to fan letters and emails. One day, he befriended a girl named Zhao Xuan (Liu Yifei) through a chatroom. He told her that he's actually Ashin, the lead vocal of Mayday. She started writing letters to him, believing that he was Ashin. Finally, Xuan's peking opera group from school gets to leave Harbin and travel to Taiwan to perform. The two promised to meet in a library, but Ah Lei didn't have the courage to meet up with her. He decides to follow her around, but did not expect that she followed him back, and that she saw through his lies all along.

Cast
 Bolin Chen as Ah Lei
 Liu Yifei as Zhao Xuan
 Tien Feng as Zhao Geng-sheng
 Mayday as themselves

Production
 The filming of Love of May begun on Oct 18, 2003.
 The filming locations of Love of May include Taipei, Sanyi, and Harbin.

Release
 Taiwan: July 16, 2004
 Mainland China: July 30, 2004

Box Office
 Love of May earned 0.46 million New Taiwan dollars on its opening week at Taiwan.
 Love of May earned 1.16 million New Taiwan dollars at Taipei.

References

External links
 

2004 films
Taiwanese romance films
2000s Mandarin-language films
Films directed by Hsu Hsiao-ming
2000s romance films